Stage 13 is a 30-minute American anthology television series produced and directed and hosted by Wyllis Cooper. Ten episodes aired on CBS in early 1950.  Featured actors included Leslie Nielsen. Actor Dennis Patrick played one of the first vampires on TV, in an episode of Stage 13.

External links
Stage 13 List of episodes at CVTA

Stage 13 Encyclopedia of Television Shows, 1925 through 2010, 2d ed., page 1008, #8766 
Stage 13 Broadcasting & Telecasting, Vol. 38, No. 25, June 19, 1950. Washington DC. Page 15.
1950s American anthology television series
1950 American television series debuts
1950 American television series endings
CBS original programming